Siân Phillips is a Welsh fiddle player specialising in Welsh folk and fiddle music.

Born in South Wales and raised primarily in Aberaeron, Ceredigion, she gained her knowledge of Welsh folk music from playing with several folk dance groups. She has been a member of the following folk and Celtic bands: Bysedd Main, Constitution Hillbillies, Cromlech, Ysbryd, Wild Welsh Women, Celtish, and the Rowdies and guested with many more.
She organized an annual music festival, the Fiddle Festival of Wales.
Siân currently lives and has her own business ‘Fiddler’s Elbow Grease‘ making balms from hemp, in North Oxfordshire and retired as a performing  musician in 2017 due to fibromyalgia.

Publications
Phillips has arranged and edited a book of Welsh Fiddle Tunes, published by Schott Music Publishers under their Schott World Music Series, which was released in April 2013.

Discography
Albums include:
 Gramundus, Fflach Tradd CD218
 Jac to Bach, Speedy Kat; SPDKCD01
"Centrifusion" (band: Celtish)

References

External links
 sianfiddle.co.uk

Folk fiddlers
English fiddlers
Year of birth missing (living people)
Living people
21st-century violinists